Glazypeau Mountain is a summit in Garland County, in the U.S. state of Arkansas.

Glazypeau is derived from the French "glaise à Paul", referring to a nearby salt lick.

References

Landforms of Garland County, Arkansas
Mountains of Arkansas